Herbert Alfred Peschel (September 2, 1913 – April 17, 1986) was a Canadian football player who played for the Winnipeg Blue Bombers. He won the Grey Cup with them in 1935, 1939 and 1941 and is a member of the Blue Bombers Hall of Fame. He attended North Dakota State University, where he is also a member of their hall of fame.

References

1913 births
1986 deaths
American football tackles
Canadian football tackles
American players of Canadian football
North Dakota State Bison football players
Winnipeg Blue Bombers players
Players of American football from North Dakota